The eared hutia or large-eared hutia (Mesocapromys auritus) is a small, endangered, rat-like mammal found only on the Caribbean island of Cayo Fragoso, off the north coast of Cuba. It lives in coastal mangrove forests and swamps, and is threatened by habitat loss. It is a member of the hutia subfamily (Capromyinae), a group of rodents native to the Caribbean that are mostly endangered or extinct.

References

Hutias
Mesocapromys
Mammals of Cuba
Hutia, Eared
Mammals described in 1970
Taxonomy articles created by Polbot
Endemic fauna of Cuba